The 1991 All-Ireland Senior Ladies' Football Championship Final was the eighteenth All-Ireland Final and the deciding match of the 1991 All-Ireland Senior Ladies' Football Championship, an inter-county ladies' Gaelic football tournament for the top teams in Ireland.

Waterford had beaten  in the Munster final to prevent a ten-in-a-row, and went on to beat Laois by seven points.

References

!
All-Ireland Senior Ladies' Football Championship Finals
Waterford county ladies' football team matches
Laois county ladies' football team matches
All-Ireland